Burghausen may refer to several places in Germany:

Burghausen, Altötting, a town in southeastern Bavaria
Burghausen Castle
Burghausen bei Münnerstadt, part of Münnerstadt in northern Bavaria
Burghausen bei Freising, part of Kirchdorf an der Amper in central Bavaria
Burghausen bei Schweinfurt, part of Wasserlosen in northern Bavaria
Burghausen (Leipzig), a suburb of Leipzig city in Saxony.
SV Wacker Burghausen, a German football team.